Midori (みどり, ミドリ) is the Japanese word for "green" and may refer to:

Places 
 Midori, Gunma
 Midori-ku, Chiba
 Midori-ku, Nagoya
 Midori-ku, Sagamihara
 Midori-ku, Saitama
 Midori-ku, Yokohama

People

Given name 
 Midori, (born 1961) an alias of new-age musician Medwyn Goodall
 Midori (actress), born 1968 as Michele Watley,  pornographic actress
 Midori (author), an author on human sexuality
 , Japanese cross-country skier
 Midori Francis, (1994) American actress
 , Japanese-American violinist
 , Japanese football manager 
 , Japanese politician 
 , Japanese former figure skater
 Midori Kahata|, (1995), Japanese group rhythmic gymnast
 , Japanese voice actress
 , Japanese idol
 , Japanese actress
 , Japanese curler
 Midori Kono Thiel, (1933), Japanese American calligrapher 
 , Japanese model 
 , Japanese politician
 , Japanese pianist
 , Japanese translator
 , Japanese stage actress
 Midori Shimizu (disambiguation)
 , Japanese horticulturalist
 , Japanese judo wrestler
 Midori Snyder, an American fantasy author
 Midori Suzuki (disambiguation)
 Midori Tanaka, Japanese athlete 
 , Japanese composer 
 , Japanese volleyball player
 Midori Tateyama, (born 1980), Japanese game scriptwriter 
 , Japanese sport shooter

Surname 
 , Japanese actress
 , Japanese actress and gravure idol
 , Japanese karate instructor

Technology 
 Midori (operating system), the code name for an operating system that was being developed at Microsoft
 Midori (web browser), a web browser based on Electron and part of Xfce
 midori Javascript Framework, a JavaScript framework
 Midori and Midori-2 (or Advanced Earth Observing Satellite), two satellites launched by the Japan Aerospace Exploration Agency

Entertainment and arts 
 Midori (band), a Japanese jazz-punk fusion band
 Midori (1992 film), a 1992 anime film
 Midori Days, a manga and anime series and its title character Midori Kasugano

Fictional characters   
 Midori, a mecha in the anime series Lagrange: The Flower of Rin-ne
 Midori, the main character of the novel series .hack//CELL
 Midori, an enemy character in the video game The Punisher
 Midori Aoyama (also known as Princess Zerian), a character in the tokusatsu Toumei Dori-chan
 Midori Chitose, a character in the visual novel and anime Green Green
 Midori Gurin, a character from the video game Yandere Simulator
 Midori Kobayashi, a character in the novel Norwegian Wood
 Midori Nishizono, a character in the visual novel and anime Little Busters!
 Midori Sugiura, a character in the manga and anime series My-Hime and My-Otome
 Midori Yamabuki (also known as Midori Norimaki), a character in the manga and anime series Dr. Slump
 Sapphire Kawashima (nicknamed "Midori"), a character from the novel and anime series Hibike! Euphonium
 Midori Asakusa, a character in the anime and manga series Keep Your Hands Off Eizouken!
Midori Sawatari (猿渡 美鳥), a character from School Babysitters

Other 
 Midori (train), a train service operating in Japan
 Midori (liqueur), a bright green, melon-flavored liqueur made by Suntory

See also 
 

Japanese-language surnames
Japanese feminine given names